Foolishness is the unawareness or lack of  social norms which causes offence, annoyance, trouble and/or injury. The things such as impulsivity and/or  influences may affect a person's ability to make otherwise  reasonable  decisions. In this sense, it differs from stupidity, which is the lack of intelligence.  An act of foolishness is called folly.

Concept 
Andreas Maercker in 1995 defined foolishness as rigid, dogmatic, and inflexible thinking which makes feelings of bitterness and probable annoyance. It is considered the foundation of illusions of grandiosity like omniscience, omnipotence and inviolability.

The Book of Proverbs characterizes traits of foolishness. Foolishness and wisdom are contrasted in Paul's letter to the Corinthians.  He condemns intellectual arrogance and advocates a humble attitude instead of foolishness, in which it is then possible to learn. 

Plato transvalued reason over foolishness, to him integrity of acceptance of a state itself was the beginning of wisdom, he said "He is the wisest man who knows himself to be ill-equipped for the study of wisdom".

See also
 Silliness
 Ridiculous
 Absurdity
 As a dog returns to his vomit, so a fool repeats his folly - specific biblical proverb
 In Praise of Folly

References

External links

Knowledge